Istrianis squamodorella is a moth of the family Gelechiidae. It is found in Palestine and Iraq.

The larvae feed on the leaves of Populus species.

References

External links

 

Moths described in 1935
Istrianis